Gustavus Vaughan Brooke (25 April 1818 – 11 January 1866), commonly referred to as G. V. Brooke, was an Irish stage actor who enjoyed success in Ireland, England and Australia.

Early life
Brooke was born in Dublin, Ireland, the eldest son of Gustavus Brooke (died 1827), a graduate of Trinity College, Dublin, and his wife Frances, daughter of Matthew Bathurst. He was educated at a school at Edgeworthstown under Lovell Edgeworth, a brother of the novelist Maria Edgeworth, and afterwards at Dublin at a school run by the Rev. William Jones. There he showed talent in a school play; when he was allowed to see William Charles Macready perform in Dublin in March 1832 he was determined to go on the stage. He interviewed Calcraft, the manager of the Dublin Theatre, and early in 1833 on account of the failure of Edmund Kean to fulfil his engagement at Dublin, Brooke was given an opportunity to appear in the part of William Tell. He was billed as "a young gentleman under 14 years of age" (he was really almost 15) and played with some success. Other appearances followed as Virginius and Young Norval. He appeared at the Royal Victoria Theatre, London, in October 1834 as Virginius with little success.

Acting career develops

Brooke toured the English provincial theatres for three years, and then played a season at Dublin in October 1837. He had a qualified success, which was followed by a more successful season at Belfast in January 1838. He continued to play in the provinces and in Ireland, and in 1841 accepted an engagement with Macready's company in London, but finding himself cast for a small part declined the role. He returned to the provinces and refused several offers of parts in London. He had successful seasons at Manchester, Liverpool and other large towns, among his characters being Richard III, Romeo, Macbeth, Virginius, Hamlet, Othello, Iago and Brutus. He played Othello to Macready's Iago at Manchester. Later on he was with Edwin Forrest, and in October 1846 took the part of Romeo at Dublin to Helena Faucit's Juliet. Other roles opposite Faucit included Claude Melnotte, Orlando, Hamlet, Macbeth, Richard III, Sir Giles Overreach, Leontes and Faulconbridge.

On 3 January 1848 Brooke was a success as Othello at the Olympic Theatre, London. In the same season his rendering of Sir Giles Overreach was pronounced by one critic as not falling far short of Edmund Kean's, and more than one writer called him the greatest tragedian of the day. Brooke, however, did not have the temperament to make the best use of his success. He was not a good businessman and drank too much. After playing for some time in the country his magnificent voice began to fail, and in 1850 he was obtaining advice from a London specialist who would not allow him to appear more than once or twice a week. However, in November of that year he was playing with Helena Faucit again and drawing large crowds. In October 1851 he was married to Marianne Bray. In December 1851 he went to America, and during the next 18 months had much success.

On his return to England, Brooke played several of his old parts at Drury Lane, and for the first time, Macbeth, with such success that he not only re-established his own reputation but saved the fortunes of the theatre. In 1854 he met George Coppin and agreed to go to Australia to give two hundred performances in the major towns there and in New Zealand. He left England on 25 November 1854, played a week at Cape Town Garrison Theatre and arrived at Melbourne on 23 February 1855. The Australian tour opened three days later at the Queen's Theatre, Melbourne; Brooke stayed in Australia for more than six years. When he arrived he had a repertoire of some 40 characters, and before he left he had almost doubled the number. His voice had regained its beauty, his art had matured. He did some of his best work while in Australia. The critics were unanimous in placing him as one of the great actors of all time, although occasional failures were admitted, Romeo being one of his less successful characters. He excelled particularly in tragedy, but also played comedy and Irish parts with success. Brooke's last Melbourne appearance was on 28 May 1861. On the 30 May he boarded the SS Great Britain, travelling with his future wife, Avonia Jones, and her mother. They arrived in Liverpool 5 August 1861.

Financial difficulties
In early life Brooke was financially careless, but in Australia for a time lived comparatively carefully, and while in partnership with Coppin at one time thought himself to be a rich man. But his ventures were not always successful. He eventually lost everything, and unfortunately began drinking again. On his return to England about the middle of 1861 he played a season at Drury Lane, beginning in October with so little success that at its conclusion he found himself in financial difficulties. In February he married Avonia Stanhope Jones (12 July 1839 – 4 October 1867), a young actress of considerable ability whom he had met in Australia. His drinking habits continued however, and he was often in great difficulties. In Ireland in May, 1863 at the Theatre Royal, Dublin he played Julian St. Pierre in The Wife; in the cast was a young actor Sydney Bancroft, later better known as Sir Squire Bancroft.
Brooke's wife, who had been away playing an engagement in America, contacted George Coppin, then on a visit to England, who offered Brooke an engagement for two years in Australia. Brooke pulled himself together to play a farewell season at Belfast, and his last performance as Richard III on 23 December 1865 was enthusiastically received.

He left Plymouth for Australia on 1 January 1866 in the SS London, which went down in a storm ten days later. Brooke toiled bravely at the pumps of the sinking vessel, and when all hope was gone was seen standing composedly by the companionway. As the last overcrowded lifeboat pulled away he called "Give my last farewell to the people of Melbourne". He was 47 years old. Actor Fred Younge read a moving tribute to his longtime associate on 17 March 1866 at the Victoria Theatre, Sydney, the scene of many of his triumphs.
His widow, who had remained in England rather than risk encountering Brooke's first wife Marianne, died from consumption the following year.

Recognition in Melbourne 

Shortly after the news of Brooke's death arrived in Melbourne, members of the Melbourne Press Club decided on a series of stage performances to raise money for a permanent memorial in the form of a statue.
They chose Boucicault's London Assurance, which they played several times to good houses in Melbourne and country centres. They supplemented the profits with donations from the public, but when the bust arrived from Charles Summers' studio in England, there was still insufficient funds to cover its cost, and Gilbert Roberts offered to make up the difference if it were first unveiled at his Duke of Edinburgh Theatre. The custodians of the statue agreed and the ceremony went off smoothly, however some important people took offence at not having been consulted and held a more dignified unveiling at the art gallery attached to the Public Library, installing it between busts of Edmund and Charles Kean.

Legacy
In the 1960s, the Canadian novelist Robertson Davies and the Australian composer Peter Sculthorpe discussed collaborating on an opera based on Brooke's Australian adventures.

References

Notes
Brooke, Gustavus Vaughan (1818–1866) H. L. Oppenheim, Australian Dictionary of Biography, Volume 3, MUP, 1969, pp. 243–245

Further reading

 H. L. Oppenheim, 'Brooke, Gustavus Vaughan (1818–1866)', Australian Dictionary of Biography, National Centre of Biography, Australian National University
 
 

1818 births
1866 deaths
Irish male stage actors
Australian male stage actors
19th-century Australian male actors
Male actors from Dublin (city)
Irish emigrants to colonial Australia
Deaths due to shipwreck at sea
19th-century Irish male actors